The Nebraska House of Representatives was the lower house of the Nebraska Legislature during the days when Nebraska was a territory from 1854 to 1867 and then again when Nebraska was a state from 1867 until 1937. In 1934, Nebraska voters amended the Nebraska Constitution to reconfigure the Nebraska Legislature to a unicameral system. This system became effective for the 1937 legislative session. Beginning as a territorial lower house in 1854, it had 26 members; this number was raised to 39 members at the time of the first state constitution's promulgation in 1866, and the second state constitution in 1875 limited membership in the House at 100 members, a limit which would be filled by 1881. The last representatives were elected to a two-year term in 1934 and began their service with the final legislative session in 1935.

References

See also
 Members of the Nebraska House of Representatives

Defunct lower houses
Nebraska Legislature
1936 disestablishments in Nebraska
1867 establishments in Nebraska
Republican Party members of the Nebraska House of Representatives